Nievoldhagen is an abandoned village in the Hödinger woods in Saxony-Anhalt in Germany. The settlement was destroyed by war during 16th century.

Location 
Nievoldhagen is located in the woods which are the middle of Behnsdorf, Eschenrode, Hödingen and Hörsingen. The village is located on the road from Behnsdorf, after Hörsingen since 2006.

History  
Nievoldhagen was a village settlement that was destroyed by a war. All that remains today is the foundation of the village church. The village was deserted in 1540 .

The inhabitants presumably got their water from the nearby Angerborn spring, a spring that still exists to this day. At present, the Nievoldhagen area is under the care of German forest services.

The legend of Nievoldhagen 
The legend of Nievoldhagen tells of a time when three swine herders from Eschenrode, Hörsingen and Behnsdorf shepherded their animals where the settlement used to be. One of the swines had uncovered the Nievoldhagen church bell while digging for food. The herders could not agree on whose swine it was that uncovered the bell, as the owner of this swine's village would keep the church bell. To settle their differences the herders agreed that whoever could transport the bell to their village first got to keep it. Each ran off towards their homes. The shepherd from Eschenrode caught a stroke of good luck and met a fellow villager with a carriage immediately upon exiting the woods. He told him what had happened and so the bell ended up in Eschenrode.

Today the bell still hangs alongside the two modern day church bells in the church of Eschenrode and sounds every day at six o'clock.

Former populated places in Germany
Ghost towns in Germany